Jhinkpani is a census town in Pashchimi Singhbhum district in the Indian state of Jharkhand.

Demographics
 India census, Jhinkpani had a population of 13,068. Males constitute 51% of the population and females 49%. Jhinkpani has an average literacy rate of 68.00%, higher than the national average of 59.5%: male literacy is 78.07%, and female literacy is 58.21%. In Jhinkpani, 15% of the population is under 6 years of age.

References

External links

Cities and towns in West Singhbhum district